Shiva (born 10 December 1982) is an Indian actor, comedian, RJ and dialogue writer who has featured in Tamil language films, and had previously been a Radio jockey with Radio Mirchi. Acting mainly in comedy films, he rose to fame following his performances in the Venkat Prabhu directorials Chennai 600028 and Saroja, before also featuring in Thamizh Padam. His tenure with Radio Mirchi earned him the nickname "Mirchi Shiva".

Film career

2001-2008
Shiva's first film role was a supporting role in the 2001 film 12B, where he played Shaam's friend. He debuted as a lead actor in Venkat Prabhu's 2007 sports comedy Chennai 600028 alongside ten other debut actors. His next role, again under Venkat's direction, Saroja (2008). Both films were box office hits.

2010-2019
Shiva then starred in Thamizh Padam (2010), a full-length parody of contemporary Tamil cinema, and his performance earned rave reviews. His comedy Va Quarter Cutting, was an average grosser. His first 2011 release became the long-delayed romantic drama Pathinaaru, which was his first non-comedy venture. During the period, he also completed another comedy film titled Siva Poojaiyil Karadi, by Rama Narayanan, but the film was never released.

In 2012, he featured alongside Vimal in Sundar C's comedy film Kalakalappu, which won positive reviews and performed well commercially. Portraying the role of the small-time crook Raghu, critics noted that Shiva was the film's "scene-stealer" and "carries the first half with his quips". The success of the film fetched the actor more scripts and Shiva went on to feature in four comedies in 2013. His first release Thillu Mullu, a remake of the 1981 Rajinikanth starrer, featured him alongside Isha Talwar and Prakash Raj and also fared well commercially. The actor also won positive portrayal of a conman with a critic noting that "Shiva has taken the entire film in his shoulders and has given his best. His comic timing is perfect and the one-liners are hilarious." His second release of the year Sonna Puriyathu, where he played a dubbing artist, also won good reviews. Sudhish Kamath of The Hindu praised the actor's performance noting that "Nobody makes silly jokes work with a straight face like Shiva does", also that he is the "funny man pretending to be important". The next release Ya Ya, featured him alongside Santhanam in the lead role. Shiva was next seen in Kiruthiga Udhayanidhi's directorial debut Vanakkam Chennai, a romantic musical opposite Priya Anand. The film received positive to mixed reviews, but was a commercial success.

In 2015, he starred in two films with Masala Padam and 144. In 2016, his films were Adra Machan Visilu and  Chennai 600028 II, a sequel sports comedy to Chennai 600028. In 2018, Kalakalappu 2, the sequel to that film Kalakalappu, has been released, directed by the same Sundar C. After a gap of eight years, C. S. Amudhan's Thamizh Padam 2 (2018) has  released, amidst high expectations. He has opened to good reviews from the audience. Although the movie has a predictable story, the humour part has struck the chord with the viewers. His voiceover has also appeared in films such as Vandi (2018) and Charlie Chaplin 2 (2019).

Personal life
Shiva married his long time girlfriend and former national level badminton player Priya on 15 November 2012. Their son, Agasthya, was born on 25 June 2019.

Filmography

As actor

TV Host
Super Kids (Colors Tamil)

As lyricist
 "Saudi Baasha" (Va)
 "Rosa Hai" (Sonna Puriyathu)

As singer
 "Rosa Hai Song" (Sonna Puriyathu)

As writer
 Aadama Jaichomada (2014) (dialogues)

As narrator
Vandi (2018)
 Charlie Chaplin 2 (2019)

References

External links
 

Indian male film actors
Tamil male actors
Indian radio presenters
Living people
1982 births